The 2011 Premiership Rugby Sevens Series, named for sponsorship reasons as the 2011 J.P Morgan Asset Management Premiership Rugby 7s Series, was the second Rugby Union 7-a-side competition for the 12 2011-12 Aviva Premiership Clubs. It began on Friday 15 July and lasted four weeks, with the final at the Twickenham Stoop on 5 August 2011. Newcastle Falcons won the title, beating Saracens in the final.

Format
The twelve Premiership Clubs were split into three Groups – A, B and C – with each group playing on a consecutive Friday in July. Each team in the group played each other once, to the International Rugby Board Laws of the Game – 7s Variations. Based on the result, teams would receive:
4 points for a win
2 points for a draw
1 bonus point for a loss by seven points or less
1 bonus point for scoring four or more tries in a match
Following all the games, the winner and runner up in the group would progress to the finals. In the finals, the six teams were split into two pools. Again teams played each other once and points were awarded based on the result. Following the culmination of this stage the winners of each pool progressed to the final, the winner of that game being declared the champions.

Group stage

Group A
Played at The Recreation Ground, Bath on Friday 15 July 2011.

Group B
Played at Franklin's Gardens, Northampton on Friday 22 July 2011.

Group C
Played at Edgeley Park, Stockport on Friday 29 July 2011.

Final stage
The Final Stage was played at The Stoop, Twickenham on Friday 5 August 2011.

For the finals, the 6 qualified teams were split into two pools of three teams.  Scoring will be the same as in the previous rounds (4 points for a win, etc.), and the winner of each pool progressed to the final.

Pool A

Pool B

Final
Newcastle Falcons 7s and Saracens 7s won their respective pools and therefore played in the final of the 2011 Premiership Rugby Sevens Series.

 Newcastle Falcons 7s won the 2011 Premiership Rugby Sevens Series.

References

Sevens
Premiership Rugby Sevens Series
English